Kolga-Jaani is a small borough in Viljandi Parish, Viljandi County, central Estonia. Prior to the administrative reform of Estonian local governments in 2017, it was the administrative centre of Kolga-Jaani Parish. Kolga-Jaani has a population of 417.

References

External links
Kolga-Jaani Parish 

Boroughs and small boroughs in Estonia
Kreis Fellin